Samuel Woodward (1790–1838) was an English geologist and antiquary. 

Samuel or Sam Woodward may also refer to:

Samuel Bayard Woodward (1787–1850), American psychiatrist
Samuel Pickworth Woodward (1821–1865), English geologist and malacologist
Samuel Walter Woodward (1848–1917), American businessman, co-founder of the Woodward & Lothrop department store
Samuel Woodward, 18th-century Massachusetts minister, builder of the Rev. Samuel Woodward House
Samuel Woodward (white supremacist), American neo-nazi charged in the 2018 murder of Blaze Bernstein

See also
Sam Woodyard (1925–1988), American jazz drummer
Samuel Woodworth  (1784–1842), American author